Ischnocampa lithosioides is a moth of the family Erebidae. It was described by Walter Rothschild in 1912. It is found in Brazil.

References

Ischnocampa
Moths described in 1912